The Jamaica Boys was an American, Queens-based, funk trio, that existed in the late 1980s. Group member Mark Stevens was the brother of Chaka Khan, and also toured with her as a backup singer.

One of their members, Marcus Miller, was Luther Vandross's writing partner on several of the latter's hits.

Members
 Mark Stevens
 Dinky Bingham (who replaced Mark Stevens)
 Marcus Miller
 Lenny White
 Bernard Wright
 Spaceman Patterson
 Eric "CoDee" Cody

Singles
 Shake It Up! (1990)
 Pick Up The Phone! (1990)
 (It's That) Lovin' Feeling (1987)
 Spend Some Time With Me (1988)

Discography
 Jamaica Boys, Warner Bros. Records, 1987
 J Boys, Warner Bros. Records, 1989
 Shake It Up, Warner Bros. Records, 1990

References

American jazz ensembles from New York City
American funk musical groups
Musical groups established in 1986
Musical groups disestablished in 1991
1986 establishments in New York (state)
1991 disestablishments in New York (state)